Sazavis was an enantiornithine bird from the Late Cretaceous. It might have been related to Nanantius and lived in what is now the Kyzyl Kum of Uzbekistan.

There is a single species known to date, Sazavis prisca.

Etymology 
Generic name composed of the Kazakh саз (saz) ("clay") and the Latin avis ("bird"), referring to the clay depression of Uzbekistan, near which this bird was discovered. The specific name derived from the Latin priscus and means "ancient".

Description 

The bone has been found in the Bissekty Formation.

Paleoecology 
Sazavis possibly lived on nearby coasts or in the liman forests dominated by the flowering plants of the Platanaceae family.

References

External links 
 

Bissekty Formation
Enantiornitheans
Fossils of Uzbekistan
Fossil taxa described in 1989
Late Cretaceous birds of Asia
Prehistoric bird genera
Turonian life